Eugene F. Clark (August 14, 1850 – September 9, 1932) was a member of the Wisconsin State Assembly and the Wisconsin State Senate.

Biography
Clark was born on August 14, 1850 in Kingfield, Maine. He moved with his parents to Monticello, Green County, Wisconsin in 1854 and to Galesville, Wisconsin in 1855. Clark died in 1932.

Career
Clark was elected to the Senate in 1916 and re-elected in 1920. Previously, he was a member of the Assembly in 1895 and 1901. He was a Republican.

References

People from Kingfield, Maine
People from Galesville, Wisconsin
Republican Party Wisconsin state senators
Republican Party members of the Wisconsin State Assembly
1850 births
1932 deaths